Erwin Walter Maximilian Straus (11 November 1891, Frankfurt am Main – 20 May 1975, Lexington, Kentucky) was a German-American phenomenologist and neurologist who helped to pioneer anthropological medicine and psychiatry, a holistic approach to medicine that is critical of mechanistic and reductionistic approaches to understanding and treating human beings.

Some of his work can also be regarded as a precursor to or early version of neurophenomenology.  Straus taught at Black Mountain College.

His books published in English include:
 Phenomenology: Pure and Applied (1964, Duquesne University Press)
 Phenomenological Psychology (1966, Basic Books)
 Psychiatry and Philosophy (1969, Springer)
 Phenomenology of Memory (1970, Duquesne University Press)
 Language and Language Disturbances (1974, Duquesne University Press)
 Man, Time, and World: Two Contributions to Anthropological Psychology (1982, Humanities Press)
 On Obsession: A Clinical and Methodological Study (1987, Johnson Reprint Corp)

Bibliography 

 Zu Leben und Werk von Erwin Walter Maximilian Straus (1891-1975), by Franz Bossong (1991, Königshausen & Neumann)

External links
 Decade of the Person: Tribute to Erwin Straus MD  by Brian Koehler

1891 births
1975 deaths
20th-century American psychologists
German psychologists
University of Kentucky faculty
German emigrants to the United States